The Sidecar World Championship is an annual event held by the Fédération Internationale de Motocyclisme (FIM). The first World Championship tournament took place in 1949. As all other World Championships in moto racing, it consists of a series of races run throughout a calendar year in which the riders with the most accumulated points are awarded as world champions.

Medalists

References

Sidecar racing
World motorcycle racing series